Samuel Bolduc (born December 9, 2000) is a Canadian professional ice hockey player for the  New York Islanders of the National Hockey League (NHL). He was selected by the Islanders in the second round, 57th overall, at the 2019 NHL Entry Draft. Bolduc played four seasons of junior hockey in the Quebec Major Junior Hockey League (QMJHL) with the Blainville-Boisbriand Armada and Sherbrooke Phoenix.

Playing career
Bolduc started his career with Blainville-Boisbriand Armada of the Quebec Major Junior Hockey League (QMJHL) before getting traded to the Sherbrooke Phoenix on December 15, 2019. Bolduc was drafted 57th overall by the New York Islanders in the 2019 NHL Entry Draft. On April 30, 2020, he was signed to a three-year entry-level contract by the Islanders. Bolduc made his NHL debut in a 5–2 loss to the Toronto Maple Leafs on January 23, 2023.

His first NHL point, a goal, came on February 7, 2023, against the Seattle Kraken. It was the first, and game-winning, goal of a 4–0 Islanders victory.

Career statistics

Awards and honours

References

External links
 

2000 births
Living people
Blainville-Boisbriand Armada players
Bridgeport Islanders players
Bridgeport Sound Tigers players
Canadian ice hockey defencemen
Ice hockey people from Quebec
New York Islanders draft picks
New York Islanders players
Sherbrooke Phoenix players
Sportspeople from Laval, Quebec